Pentti Repo (23 October 1930 – 27 October 1997) was a Finnish athlete. He competed in the men's discus throw at the 1960 Summer Olympics and the 1964 Summer Olympics.

References

External links
 

1930 births
1997 deaths
Athletes (track and field) at the 1960 Summer Olympics
Athletes (track and field) at the 1964 Summer Olympics
Finnish male discus throwers
Olympic athletes of Finland
Place of birth missing